Barbara Wharton Low (March 23, 1920 – January 10, 2019) was a biochemist, biophysicist, and a researcher involved in discovering the structure of penicillin and the characteristics of other antibiotics. Her early work at Oxford University with Dorothy Hodgkin used X-ray crystallography to confirm the molecular structure of penicillin, which at the time was the largest molecule whose structure has been determined using that method. Later graduate work saw her study with Linus Pauling and Edwin Cohn before becoming a professor in her own right. Low's laboratory would accomplish the discovery of the pi helix, investigate the structure of insulin, and conduct research into neurotoxins.

Childhood and education
Low was born on March 23, 1920, in Lancaster, England, to her parents, Matthew Low and Mary Jane Wharton. She undertook her tertiary education at Somerville College, Oxford, graduating with a bachelor's degree in 1943. That same year she began work under the biochemist Dorothy Hodgkin as a research assistant for the university's department of chemical crystallography. Due to Hodgkin's focus on protein crystallography, for which she was later awarded a Nobel prize, Low and her academic colleagues were engaged in researching the use of X-rays to determine the structure of crystallized proteins. Low obtained Master's and doctoral degrees in chemistry from Oxford University in 1946 and 1948 respectively, before moving on to a research associate position at the California Institute of Technology (Caltech). To do so, she obtained a United States passport through emigration and later full citizenship in 1956.

While at Caltech, she worked under Nobel Laureate Linus Pauling for a year before moving to another yearly research associate position at Harvard University working with Edwin Cohn. The following year, in 1950, Harvard offered Low her first academic appointment as assistant professor of biophysical chemistry at the newly created laboratory building for "fundamental studies of the makeup of body fluids and cells". She relocated to Columbia University in 1956 as an associate professor, and was promoted to a full professorship in 1966. Low continued at Columbia until her retirement in 1990 as professor emerita of biochemistry and molecular biophysics. She still did routine academic rounds as a "Special Lecturer" at the university, however, up until 2013.

Career

During Low's early work with the Hodgkin laboratory in the final years of World War II, she discovered the sulfur elemental components of penicillin that allowed for its mass production and later transformation into other antibiotic compounds. Up to that point, a pure sample of penicillin had not been successfully synthesized due to a lack of understanding of its physical structure of the compound, specifically the variation of its penam core. Due to the size of the molecule, only careful examination of the X-ray results allowed for any information on the overall construction, but the two finally completed the investigation in 1945. During this time, she was one of the first scientists in the United States to conduct studies of X-ray diffraction of crystalline proteins in a laboratory setting. At that time, it was the largest molecule ever to have had its structure determined by crystallography. Because the knowledge Low and Hodgkin obtained was of such importance and the research had been funded by the UK government, however, their work on penicillin remained classified for decades afterwards.

At Harvard, Low turned to topics she would continue in her later positions at Columbia University: the structure and composition of insulin and structural investigations into albumin crystals. Once her Columbia lab was established, Low also included research into neurotoxins on her schedule, including curare and its derivatives. The general protein studies from her lab resulted in 1952 with the discovery of the pi helix, a fundamental structural component of a significant number of proteins. Her X-ray crystallography images were used in 1953 to disprove the existence of "beta ice" as first claimed by Russian scientist N. Saljakov to be a different non-hexagonal form of ice.

As a member of the Columbia University committee on affirmative action, Low strongly believed in diversifying the faculty and workstaff at the university. She wished to help improve the standing of women in science and did so in one way by hiring and nurturing a large number of female graduate students in her lab.

Honors and awards
Low received a fellowship for women scholars in 1946 from the American Association of University Women. This Rose Sidgwick Memorial Fellowship is specifically offered to women researchers in England to allow them to study in the United States and was awarded to Low for her work on the structure of penicillin. She was elected to the American Academy of Arts and Sciences in 1953.

Personal life
Low identified herself as a Quaker and valued humanitarian work. At Somerville, she studied the Polish language and considered pursuing post-war aid in Poland. During her three-year assistantship, her leftist ideologies created conflict with Margaret Roberts, another study of Hodgkins who would later become Baroness Thatcher and, eventually, the Prime Minister of the United Kingdom. Her political views and affiliation with pro-world peace organizations rumored to have association with communist parties also created conflict with her standing as a U.S. citizen. Low was denied a U.S. visa until the 1950s, during which time she became a U.S. citizen. In 1950, Low also married Harvard historian . She was widowed in 1995 and spent her later years at her home in Riverdale, Bronx. She died on January 10, 2019, at the age of 98.

Selected works

References

Further reading
 
 

British biochemists
British women biochemists
British biophysicists
American women biologists
20th-century American biologists
1920 births
2019 deaths
20th-century British biologists
British emigrants to the United States
Alumni of Somerville College, Oxford
Harvard University faculty
Columbia University faculty
Fellows of the American Academy of Arts and Sciences
American women academics
21st-century American women
20th-century American women scientists